Georg Friedel (6 September 1913 – 1 June 1987) was a German footballer who played for 1. FC Nürnberg. He made his debut for Nürnberg in April 1931, and went on to play 325 games for the club. He also represented the German national team, earning his only cap in a 2–2 draw against Netherlands in January 1937.

References

External links
 

1913 births
1987 deaths
German footballers
Association football forwards
Germany international footballers
1. FC Nürnberg players
Place of birth missing